Raphael Cohen-Almagor (born 1961) is an Israeli/British academic.

Cohen-Almagor received his D.Phil. in political theory from Oxford University in 1991, and his B.A. and M.A. from Tel Aviv University (both magna cum laude). In 1992–1995 he lectured at the Hebrew University Law Faculty. In 1995–2007 he taught at the University of Haifa Law School, Department of Communication, and Library and Information Studies University of Haifa. In 2019, he was distinguished visiting professor to the Faculty of Laws, University College London (UCL).

Raphael has served in various organisations, including as chairperson of “The Second Generation to the Holocaust and Heroism Remembrance” Organization in Israel; founder and director of the Medical Ethics Think-tank at the Van Leer Jerusalem Institute; member of the Israel Press Council, chairperson of library and information studies, and founder and director of Center for Democratic Studies, both at the University of Haifa. Cohen-Almagor was the Yitzhak Rabin – Fulbright Visiting Professor at UCLA School of Law and Dept. of Communication, visiting professor at Johns Hopkins University, and Fellow at the Woodrow Wilson International Center for Scholars. Presently he is chair in politics at the University of Hull, United Kingdom, and director of the Middle East Study Group. In 2008–2009 he served as acting deputy dean for research at Hull Faculty of Arts and Social Sciences.

Cohen-Almagor has published numerous articles and book chapters in the fields of political science, law, Israel studies, philosophy, media ethics, medical ethics, education, sociology, and history. Since 2000, he has been writing a monthly blog on Israeli politics, human rights concerns, scientific developments, the arts and other issues.

Concern and Respect 

Concern and respect are reiterated themes in Cohen-Almagor's scholarship. He argues that we should give equal consideration to the interest of others and grant equal respect to a person's life objects so long as they do not deliberately undermine the interests of others by interfering in a disrespectful manner. The popular culture of a democratic society is committed to seeking the influence of social cooperation that can be discerned on the basis of mutual respect between free and equal individuals. This line of reasoning should be supplemented, so Cohen-Almagor maintains, by our emphasis on the notion of concern, which is seen as the value of well-being. We ought to show equal concern for each individual's good, to acknowledge that human beings are not only rational creations but irrational, emotional creatures. In the context of medical ethics, treating people with concern means treating them with empathy – viewing people as human beings who may be a furious and frustrated while, at the same time, are capable of smiling and crying, of careful decision-making, and of impulsive reactions. Concern means giving equal weight to a person's life and autonomy. This is a combination of mind, body, and communication between the agent and those around her bed.

In his article, “On the Philosophical Foundations of Medical Ethics: Aristotle, Kant, JS Mill, and Rawls”, Cohen-Almagor argues that people should be respected qua being persons and should never be exploited. Human beings are objects of respect. Following Kant, Cohen-Almagor maintains that people are not subjective ends but are objective ends. People are beings whose existence in itself is an end, and this end should be promoted and safeguarded.

Death with Dignity 

Cohen-Almagor is a strong proponent of physician-assisted suicide and equally strong critic of euthanasia. Drawing on the various ethical, medical and legal considerations as well as on the experiences of the Netherlands, Belgium, Switzerland and Oregon, he argues that on some occasions not only passive euthanasia may be allowed but also physician-assisted suicide. People should have the ability to control the time and place of their death. Cohen-Almagor's thesis is that people, as autonomous moral agents, deserve to be treated with dignity. To treat a person with dignity requires respecting her choices and life decisions. 
 
Therefore, Cohen-Almagor calls to judge each case on its own merits and refrain from drawing sweeping conclusions that relate to categories of patients. One may try to prescribe detailed guidelines of conduct but, at the end of the day, the guidelines should be judged and evaluated in relation to each patient under consideration. The fear of sliding down the slippery slope is, indeed, tangible. Cohen-Almagor prescribes cautionary measures and safety valves. Through real-life situations, his plea for physician-assisted suicide is circumscribed.

End-of-Life Public Policies 

Key research finding 1: Patient-Physician Relationship
Cohen-Almagor has developed a right-to-die theory that: i) supports physician-assisted suicide (PAS) and opposes euthanasia;  ii) has surveyed existing policies in countries that have legislated euthanasia;  iii) called for socially responsible terminology and policies;  and iv) raised concrete concerns regarding trust between physicians and patients where euthanasia is legally permitted.  The underpinning research focuses on the responsibilities of physicians to their patients, and whether physician-assisted suicide (PAS) and euthanasia should be a part of good doctoring. Further, the research weighs patients’ autonomy and good doctoring at the end of life and demonstrates the power of law to shape policies as well as its limitations.  The Israel Dying Patient Law that Cohen-Almagor co-drafted made a substantial impact on patient-physician relationships and in promoting patient's autonomy and decision-making capacity. By July 2019, 22,000 people signed advance directives and deposited them in the Ministry of Health depository. 

Key research finding 2: Potential for abuse
A key aspect of Cohen-Almagor's work is concerned with safeguarding patient's rights and interests.  In a significant number of cases, physicians have shortened patients’ lives without their consent. Cohen-Almagor showed that there have been a number of cases where “Physicians Playing God” have abused their position and authority to make decisions that are not in the patients’ best interests. Also, end-of-life care is often compromised due to economic considerations and a shortage of resources.  Cohen-Almagor accentuates the importance of adequate palliative care at the end-of-life. 

Key research finding 3: The role of the patient's beloved people
The research highlights that the people around the patient's bed at the end-of-life are not necessarily blood relatives.  Caution is required in incidents when the best interests of the patient's family members contradict the patient's best interests. Sometimes patients’ lives are shortened because the family is unable to cope with the situation. The research on who defines patients’ best interests (patients, medical staff, people around patient's bed), discusses potential conflicts of interest and raises awareness of the consequences of emotional draining that is often the result of caring for terminal patients.  

Key research finding 4: Advance directives (ADs)
The research has evidenced that Advance Directives (ADs) are often made without an opportunity for full informed consent. For example, in the US, ADs might be utilised by medics against the patient's best interests to save costly resources. The research shows that ADs have not fulfilled their promise of facilitating decisions about end-of-life care for incompetent patients.  Many legal requirements and restrictions concerning ADs are counterproductive: despite their benevolent intentions, they have created unintended negative consequences, against patients’ wishes.  Cohen-Almagor argues that if ADs have to be used, they should be as clear and precise as possible. Open interpretations and speculation should be avoided, as they might be detrimental to the patient's best interests.  Extreme caution is required when ADs of patients with dementia are concerned, as they are no longer able to formulate clear, voluntary, well-considered, and sustainable end-of-life requests.  

Key research finding 5: Organ donations at the end of life
The research supports the rights of elderly patients. It shows that age should not serve as the decisive criterion in decisions on the allocation of organs. While age is an important variable in determining a patient's medical condition, there are other — no less important — factors that influence one's health. There are people in their 80s whose health is generally good, while there are people in their 40s in very poor health. The age criterion is too simple, too general, too sweeping. It provides too convenient an answer to a tough and troubling question. The research also shows that there is a correlation between euthanasia and organ donation in Belgium. Similar concerns were recently raised in Canada. In Belgium Euthanasia donors accounted for almost a quarter of all lung donors.  The concern is that vulnerable patients might be driven to consider euthanasia for the purpose of organ procurement, and that the planning of the death procedure might be premature, and against the wishes of the patient.

Freedom of Expression 

Cohen-Almagor dedicates much of his scholarship to delineate the confines of free expression. He has formulated principles conducive to safeguarding fundamental civil rights. Under the ‘Offence Principle’, expressions that intend to inflict psychological offence are morally on a par with physical harm, so he argues there are grounds for abridging them. A case in point is the Illinois Supreme Court which permitted the Nazis to hold a hateful demonstration in Skokie. Cohen-Almagor argues that the decision was flawed. Similarly, allowing Jewish racists to march in an Arab town in Israel is flawed.

Fighting Holocaust Denial 

In 1983, together with a small group of people Cohen-Almagor established “The Second Generation to the Holocaust and Heroism Remembrance” Organization in Israel designated to educate the youth about the Holocaust and its lessons for humanity. Within a few years, this organisation became one of the largest NGOs in the country with more than 2000 members. Cohen-Almagor served as chairman until 1987. He says that the lessons of the Holocaust for him are to stand against injustice, protect minorities, protest against wanton persecution, and promote the rights of all humans.  

Cohen-Almagor is increasingly engaged in fighting Holocaust denial. Recently, he has pushing for making Holocaust denial illegal in Britain. This is because Holocaust denial is an extreme form of hate speech that legitimises violence and calls for the killing of Jews.

Multiculturalism 

To what extent can liberal democracies interfere in internal affairs of their subcultures, especially when their conduct is illiberal? This question occupies much of Cohen-Almagor's scholarship on multiculturalism. In a piece co-authored with Will Kymlicka, Cohen-Alamgor contends that if an illiberal minority is seeking to oppress other groups, then intervention is justified in the name of self-defense. Both Cohen-Almagor and Kymlicka further assert that in the case of immigrants who come to a country knowing its laws, there is no objection to imposing liberal principles on them. The situation is more complicated with national minorities, particularly if (a) they were involuntarily incorporated into the larger state (as the Palestinians claim with regard to their incorporation into the Jewish state), and (b) they have their own formalized governments, with their own internal mechanisms for dispute resolution. In these circumstances, the legitimate scope for coercive intervention by the state may be limited. 
 
Cohen-Almagor and Kymlicka maintain that there are several things which liberals can do to promote respect for individual rights within non-liberal minority groups. Since a national minority which rules in an illiberal way acts unjustly, liberals have a right – indeed a responsibility – to speak out against such injustice, and to support any efforts the group makes to liberalize their culture. Since the most enduring forms of liberalization are those that result from internal reform, the primary focus for liberals outside the group should be to provide this sort of support. Moreover, incentives can be provided, in a non-coercive way, for liberal reforms. Cohen-Almagor and Kymlicka further recommend promoting the development of regional or international mechanisms for protecting human rights.

The Republic, Secularism and Security further expands on the conflict between multiculturalism and secularism in France.

Human Rights 

Cohen-Almagor is a human rights and peace activist. He has written against administrative detention, religious coercion, discrimination against Arabs in Israel, the 1982 Lebanon War, and the 2006 Israel-Hezbollah War. He spoke in favour of separation between state and religion, women and minority rights, patients’ rights, a two state solution to end the Israeli-Palestinian conflict, with East Jerusalem as the Palestinian capital. In 2000, he opened an international campaign to evacuate the Gaza Strip, seeing this move as the start of a Palestinian State (“Gaza First”). In late 2006 he called for early elections in Israel after he lost trust in Prime Minister Ehud Olmert, the tragic architect of the Israel-Hezbollah War. This campaign ended in February 2009, when Israel held early elections that terminated the Olmert government. In 2009, Cohen-Almagor called upon Israel to institute a national enquiry commission to address all the issues mentioned in the Goldstone Report regarding Israel's war conduct during its Cast Lead Operation (2008–2009).
During 2009–2011 he was engaged in a campaign which called for a prisoner exchange between Israel and Hamas that would bring Gilad Shalit back home. That campaign ended in October 2011, when Gilad was united with his family, and more than 1000 Palestinians were released from Israeli jails. Since 2011, Cohen-Almagor has been calling for a two state solution, believing this is the only viable and just option for both Israel and Palestine.

Peace studies 

Since the 1980s, Cohen-Almagor has been a peace activist and in recent years he has made peace and conflict resolution the focal point of his research.  Due to his involvement in politics and peace talks, he has gained invaluable insights into leaders’ thought-processing as well as access to many decision-makers, facilitators, mediators and negotiators. His research analyses the roles of international players in the context of their respective Middle East policies and bilateral relations with Israel and the Palestinians.  Cohen-Almagor provides a detailed analysis of three decades of peace negotiations between Israel and the Palestinian Liberation Organization (PLO), from the start of the Oslo process in 1993 up until present time. The inquiry relates to the design and setting of the Oslo, Stockholm and Harpsund talks, their opacity at Oslo,  and the way the host countries addressed the asymmetric power relationship between the negotiating sides. The novelty of this research is that it is based on primary resources: research in archives in Oslo, London, Washington and Jerusalem as well as on semi-structured in-depth interviews with influential decision-makers from Israel, Palestine, the United States, Sweden, Norway, Egypt and the United Kingdom.  Cohen-Almagor's research is informed by the experience of successful peace talks;  it explains the milestones in the failed peace process between Israel and the PLO since 1993, the root causes for the failure to bring about peace,  and the keys for future successful negotiations: what needs to be done in order to achieve peace between Israel and the Palestinians.

Anti-Universalism 

Unlike most liberals, Cohen-Almagor confines his scholarship to the democratic world. He says explicitly that he is concerned with all countries around the world, because he thinks that what he says is appropriate, simply because he is realistic. Some societies reject the moral notions of liberty, tolerance, autonomy, equality, and justice that liberal democracies promote. If a country is not founded on these notions, then it would be futile for us to speak about these values. Thus, his practical recommendations on freedom of expression, end-of-life and multiculturalism are restricted to the democratic world.

Books 
 The Republic, Secularism and Security: France versus the Burqa and the Niqab (2022)
 Just, Reasonable Multiculturalism: Liberalism, Culture and Coercion (2021)
Middle Eastern Shores (poetry, Hebrew, 1993)
 The Boundaries of Liberty and Tolerance (1994; Hebrew 1994, 2nd ed. 1999)
 Speech, Media and Ethics (2001], 2nd ed. 2005; Turkish 2003)
 The Right to Die with Dignity (2001) 
 Euthanasia in the Netherlands (2004)
 The Scope of Tolerance (2006)
 The Democratic Catch (2007), Hebrew
 Voyages (poetry, Hebrew, 2007)
 Confronting the Internet's Dark Side: Moral and Social Responsibility on the Free Highway (2015)

Edited Books 
 Basic Issues in Israeli Democracy (Hebrew, 1999)
 Liberal Democracy and the Limits of Tolerance (2000)
 Medical Ethics at the Dawn of the 21st Century (2000)
 Challenges to Democracy: Essays in Honour and Memory of Isaiah Berlin (2000) 
 Moral Dilemmas in Medicine (Hebrew, 2002)
 Israeli Democracy at the Crossroads (2005)
 Israeli Institutions at the Crossroads (2005)
 Public Responsibility in Israel (with Asa Kasher and Ori Arbel-Ganz, Hebrew, 2012)

External links 

Middle East Study Group, University of Hull

References

Academic staff of the University of Haifa
Living people
Academics of the University of Hull
Political philosophers
1961 births